Brian Thomas Wolfe (born November 29, 1980) is an American former professional baseball pitcher who played in Major League Baseball (MLB) for the Toronto Blue Jays, and in Nippon Professional Baseball (NPB) for the Hokkaido Nippon-Ham Fighters, Fukuoka SoftBank Hawks, and Saitama Seibu Lions.

Career
During his major league debut, Alex Rodriguez of the New York Yankees may have shouted "Mine!" to distract third baseman Howie Clark from catching an easy pop fly. Clark was unable to catch the baseball because of Rodriguez and a run scored, which was charged to Wolfe. On March 28, 2009, Wolfe was optioned to Triple AAA Las Vegas 51s, and was recalled on May 1, 2009. On December 7, 2009, Wolfe refused a minor league assignment and became a free agent.

On January 8, 2010, Wolfe agreed to a contract with the Hokkaido Nippon-Ham Fighters in the Pacific League of Nippon Professional Baseball.

On July 20, 2016, Wolfe signed with the Seibu Lions.

References

External links

, or NPB

1980 births
Living people
American expatriate baseball players in Canada
American expatriate baseball players in Japan
Baseball players from California
Brevard County Manatees players
Dunedin Blue Jays players
Fort Myers Miracle players
Fukuoka SoftBank Hawks players
Grand Canyon Rafters players
Gulf Coast Twins players
Hokkaido Nippon-Ham Fighters players
Huntsville Stars players
Las Vegas 51s players
Major League Baseball pitchers
New Britain Rock Cats players
Nippon Professional Baseball pitchers
Peoria Javelinas players
Quad Cities River Bandits players
Rochester Red Wings players
Saitama Seibu Lions players
Syracuse Chiefs players
Toronto Blue Jays players
Servite High School alumni